Çağdaş Atan (born 29 February 1980) is a Turkish  football manager and a former player who played as a central defender. He is the manager of Kayserispor of the Turkish Super League.

Club career
Atan began his career with Altay SK before moving to Marmaris Belediye G.S.K., where he signed his first professional contract, in 2000. He returned to Altay in 2001 and played for two seasons. After that, he signed for Denizlispor and Beşiktaş On 1 June 2006, he transferred to Trabzonspor, based in the Black Sea port city of Trabzon. 

In the summer of 2008 Atan signed a two-year contract with German club FC Energie Cottbus. But because the team suffered relegateion he stayed with the club just one season. After their relegation Energie Cottbus had made Atan an offer for the 2. Bundesliga, but the financial ideas of the two sides were too far apart.

On 25 June 2009 it was announced that Atan had joined FC Basel on a free transfer. He joined Basel's first team in advance of their 2009–10 season under head coach Thorsten Fink. After playing in three test games, Atan played his domestic league debut for the club in the away game in the Kybunpark on 12 July 2009 as Basel won 1–0 against St. Gallen. He scored his first goal for his new club in the home game in the St. Jakob-Park on 20 February 2010. It was the winning goal of the match as Basel won 2–1 against Aarau. Basel joined the 2009–10 UEFA Europa League in the second qualifying round. Basel advanced to the group stage, in which despite winning three of the six games the ended in third position and were eliminated. They finished four points behind group winners Roma and one behind Fulham, against whom they lost 3–2 in the last game of the stage. Atan played the full 90 minutes. At the end of the 2009–10 season he won the Double with his club. They won the League Championship title with 3 points advantage over second placed Young Boys. The team won the Swiss Cup, winning the final 6–0 against Lausanne-Sport.

Basel started in the 2010–11 UEFA Champions League third qualifying round and advanced to the group stage, but ended the group in third position. Therefore they dropped to the 2010–11 Europa League knockout phase, but here they were eliminated by Spartak Moscow. Atan played in six of the 10 Champions League matches, scoring a goal in the qualification game against hungarian team Debrecen. He also played in 10 of the 18 domestic league matches in the first half of the season, however, in the second half of the season he was no longer considered by head coach Fink. With Basel, Atan won his second Swiss Championship at the end of the 2010–11 season.

The club decided not to extend Atan's contract. In his two seasons with the club, Atan played a total of 92 games for Basel scoring a total of four goals. 44 of these games were in the Swiss Super League, five in the Swiss Cup, 16 in the UEFA competitions (Champions League and Europa League) and 27 were friendly games. He scored one goal in the domestic league, one in the Champions League and the other two were scored during the test games.

Atan returned to Turkey and in August 2011 signed for Mersin Talim Yurdu.

International career
Atan has also played and scored for the Turkish national team. He earned both of his caps as a substitute in 2004 and scored once.

Coaching career
In 2016 Atan started several tenures as assistant manager under Sergen Yalçın in various clubs.

Honours
Basel
 Swiss Super League: 2009–10
 Swiss Cup: 2009–10

References

External links

 
 
 

1980 births
Footballers from İzmir
Living people
Turkish footballers
Turkey international footballers
Turkey B international footballers
Association football central defenders
Altay S.K. footballers
Denizlispor footballers
Beşiktaş J.K. footballers
Trabzonspor footballers
FC Energie Cottbus players
FC Basel players
Mersin İdman Yurdu footballers
Akhisarspor footballers
Gaziantep F.K. footballers
Manisaspor footballers
Süper Lig players
Bundesliga players
Swiss Super League players
Swiss 1. Liga (football) players
TFF First League players
Turkish expatriate footballers
Expatriate footballers in Germany
Turkish expatriate sportspeople in Germany
Expatriate footballers in Switzerland
Turkish expatriate sportspeople in Switzerland
Turkish football managers
Alanyaspor managers
Kayserispor managers
Süper Lig managers